Beilin District is one of 11 urban districts of the prefecture-level city of Xi'an, the capital of Shaanxi Province, Northwest China. It is named after the well-known Xi'an Stele Forest, and Small Wild Goose Pagoda is also located in the district. The smallest, but most densely populated, of Xi'an's county-level divisions, it borders the districts of Xincheng to the northeast, Yanta to the south, and Lianhu to the northwest.

History
The area around the present district was organized as  during the Qing Dynasty. At the time, the name was variously spelled Hien-ning, Hsien-ning, and Hsien-ning-hsien.

Administrative divisions
As 2020, Beilin District is divided to 8 subdistricts.
Subdistricts

Education
Beilin district is an important center of Xi'an. There are many educational institutions in Beilin.

University
 Xi'an Jiaotong University
 Northwest University
 Northwestern Polytechnical University
 Xi'an University of Architecture and Technology
 Xi'an University of Technology
 Xi'an Polytechnic University

High school
 Middle School Attached to Northwestern Polytechnical University

References

External links

Districts of Xi'an